Hector Acero Sánchez (born March 18, 1966) is a Dominican former professional boxer who competed from 1989 to 2002. He held the WBC super bantamweight title from 1994 to 1995.

Boxing career
In August of 1994, he defeated Tracy Harris Patterson via split decision in a surprise upset for the WBC super bantamweight title. After winning a non-title bout against Barrington Francis in 1994, Sánchez made two defenses of his title the following year, defeating former WBA super bantamweight champion Julio Gervacio in a 12 round unanimous decision and fighting to a controversial draw against former WBC bantamweight and two-time WBC super bantamweight champion, Daniel Zaragoza. They fought again on November 6, 1995, when the WBC ordered an immediate rematch for the title. The fight was close and bloody as Zaragaza was prone to cuts throughout his career, but after 12 rounds, Sánchez lost his title via split decision.

Professional boxing record

See also
List of Super Bantamweight boxing champions
List of WBC world champions

References

External links
 

Living people
1966 births
Dominican Republic male boxers
Super-bantamweight boxers
Featherweight boxers
World super-bantamweight boxing champions
World Boxing Council champions
People from Santiago de los Caballeros
20th-century Dominican Republic people
21st-century Dominican Republic people